Iberdrola Renovables was a subsidiary of Iberdrola, headquartered in Valencia, Spain, which included companies in the domains of renewable energy, particularly wind power. The firm was the world's largest renewable energy firm: it was the world's largest owner-operator of wind farms, but also operated in the solar, hydro, biomass and wave power industries.

History
Iberdrola Renovables was registered in Madrid following its incorporation in 2001.  It started as a wholly owned business unit of Iberdrola under the name Iberenova.  In 2009 the company changed its registered office to Valencia. However, it still had a strong presence in Madrid and in Bilbao, its birthplace.

Flotation
The company was listed on the Madrid Stock Exchange in December 2007 in an initial public offering. 844,812,980 new shares were placed at a price of €5.30 each. The operation totalled €5 billion, the largest placement ever made on the Spanish market by a new company.
	
The company joined the benchmark IBEX 35 index in a February 2008 reshuffle.

Merger with Iberdrola
In July 2011, Iberdrola Renovables merged with its parent company Iberdrola and is now Iberdrola's renewable energy business. Minority shareholders could change their shares into Iberdrola shares at a 1 for 2 ratio, equivalent to a value of around €3 for each share of Iberdrola Renovables.

See also
 Enel Green Power

References

External links
 Official site

Renewable energy companies of Spain
Wind power companies
Renewable energy in Spain
Companies based in Valencia
Energy companies established in 2001
Renewable resource companies established in 2001
Energy companies disestablished in 2011
Spanish companies established in 2001
Renewable resource companies disestablished in 2011
Spanish companies disestablished in 2011
Defunct electric power companies of Spain
Iberdrola